Crescent Township is one of twenty-six townships in Iroquois County, Illinois, USA.  As of the 2010 census, its population was 590 and it contained 275 housing units.  Crescent Township was originally named Logan Township when it formed from Belmont Township on September 17, 1868. The named was then changed to Grenard Township in September 1869, and finally to Crescent Township on an unknown date.

Geography

Cities, towns, villages
 Crescent City (southeast quarter)

Cemeteries
The township contains Saint Peter's Lutheran Cemetery.

Major highways
  U.S. Route 24
  Illinois Route 49

Demographics

School districts
 Cissna Park Community Unit School District 6
 Crescent Iroquois Community Unit School District 249
 Iroquois County Community Unit School District 9

Political districts
 Illinois' 15th congressional district
 State House District 105
 State Senate District 53

References
 
 United States Census Bureau 2007 TIGER/Line Shapefiles
 United States National Atlas

External links
 City-Data.com
 Illinois State Archives

Townships in Iroquois County, Illinois
Townships in Illinois